The 10th Annual Latin Grammy Awards took place on Thursday, November 5, 2009 at the Mandalay Bay Events Center in Las Vegas, Nevada. This was the second time the show took place in Las Vegas. Juan Gabriel was honored as the Latin Recording Academy Person of the Year on November 4, the day prior to the telecast. Calle 13 were the big winners, winning five awards including Album of the Year. 2009 marked the ten-year anniversary of the Latin Grammy Awards.

Awards
Winners are in bold text.

General
Record of the Year
Calle 13 featuring Café Tacuba — "No Hay Nadie Como Tú"
 Luis Fonsi featuring Aleks Syntek, Noel Schajris and David Bisbal — "Aquí Estoy Yo"
 Ivan Lins and the Metropole Orchestra — "Arlequim Desconhecido"
 José Lugo Orchestra featuring Gilberto Santa Rosa — "Si No Vas a Cocinar"
 Laura Pausini — "En Cambio No"

Album of the Year
Calle 13 — Los de Atrás Vienen Conmigo
 Andrés Cepeda — Día Tras Día
Luis Enrique — Ciclos
 Ivan Lins and the Metropole Orchestra — Regência: Vince Mendoza
 Mercedes Sosa — Cantora 1

Song of the Year
Claudia Brant, Luis Fonsi and Gen Reuben — "Aquí Estoy Yo" (Luis Fonsi featuring Aleks Syntek, Noel Schajris and David Bisbal)
Yoel Henríquez and Jorge Luis Piloto — "Día Tras Día" (Andrés Cepeda)
 Bebe and Carlos Jean — "Me Fuí" (Bebe)
 Alejandro Lerner — "Verte Sonreir"
 Jorge Luis Piloto and Jorge Villamizar — "Yo No Sé Mañana" (Luis Enrique )

Best New Artist
Alexander Acha
 ChocQuibTown
 Claudio Corsi
 India Martínez
 Luz Rios

Pop
Best Female Pop Vocal Album
Laura Pausini — Primavera Anticipada
 Jimena Ángel — Día Azul
 Natalia Lafourcade — Hu Hu Hu
 Amaia Montero — Amaia Montero
 Luz Rios — Aire

Best Male Pop Vocal Album
Fito Páez — No sé si es Baires o Madrid
 Andrés Cepeda — Día Tras Día
 Francisco Céspedes — Te Acuerdas...
 Coti — Malditas Canciones
 Alex Ubago — Calle Ilusión

Best Pop Vocal Album by a Duo or Group
Reik — Un Día Más
 Jarabe de Palo — Orquesta Reciclando
 La Oreja de Van Gogh — A las cinco en el Astoria
 La Quinta Estación — Sin Frenos
 Presuntos Implicados — Será

Urban
Best Urban Music Album
Calle 13 — Los de Atrás Vienen Conmigo
 Daddy Yankee — Talento de Barrio
 Don Omar — iDon
 Tito El Bambino — El Patrón
 Wisin & Yandel — La Revolución

Best Urban Song
Tainy and Wisin & Yandel — "Abusadora" (Wisin & Yandel)
 Marcelo D2 and Nave — "Desabafo" (Marcelo D2)
 Daddy Yankee — "Llamado de Emergencia"
 Wisin & Yandel, 50 Cent and Nesty "La Mente Maestra" — "Mujeres In The Club" (Wisin & Yandel featuring 50 Cent)
 Don Omar — "Sexy Robotica"

Rock
Best Rock Solo Vocal Album
Draco Rosa — Teatro
 Enrique Bunbury — Hellville de Luxe
 Beto Cuevas — Miedo Escenico
 Miguel Ríos — Solo o en Compañía de Otros
 Luis Alberto Spinetta — Un Mañana

Best Rock Vocal Album by a Duo or Group
Jaguares — 45
 Airbag — Una Hora A Tokyo
 El Tri — Alex Lora de El Three a El Tri Rolas del Alma, Mi Mente y Mi Aferración
 Rata Blanca — El Reino Olvidado
 Volován — Hogar

Best Rock Song
Saúl Hernández — "Entre Tus Jardines" (Jaguares)
 Walter Giardino — "El Reino Olvidado" (Rata Blanca)
 Enrique Bunbury — "Hay Muy Poca Gente"
 Jose Luis Belmonte, Diego Frenkel and Sebastián Schachte — "Qué Me Vas a Decir" (La Portuaria)
 Airbag — "Una Hora a Tokyo"

Alternative
Best Alternative Music Album
Los Amigos Invisibles — Commercial
 Babasónicos — Mucho +
 Kinky — Barracuda
 Novalima — Coba Coba
 Zoé — Reptilectric

Best Alternative Song
Calle 13 and Café Tacuba — "No Hay Nadie Como Tú"
 Hello Seahorse! — "Bestia"
 Andrés Levin, Cucu Diamantes, Beatriz Luengo and Yotuel Romero — "Más Fuerte" (CuCu Diamantes)
 Camila Moreno — "Millones"
 Macaco — "Moving"
 Alex Pérez and Juan Son — "Nada" (Juan Son)

Tropical
Best Salsa Album
Luis Enrique — Ciclos
Oscar D'León — Tranquilamente... Tranquilo
 Issac Delgado — Así Soy
 José Lugo Orchestra — Guasábara
 Gilberto Santa Rosa — Contraste en Salsa

Best Cumbia/Vallenato Album
Peter Manjarrés and Sergio Luis Rodríguez — El Caballero "Del Vallenato"
 Silvestre Dangond and Juancho de la Espriella — El Original: La Revolución
 Diomedes Díaz — Celebremos Juntos
 Kvrass — Ombe y Como No!!
 Iván Villazón and José María "Chema" Ramos — El Vallenato Mayor

Best Contemporary Tropical Album
Omara Portuondo — Gracias
 Coronel — Superstición
 Eddy Herrera — Paso Firme
 Daniel Santacruz — Radio Rompecorazones
 Sin Ánimo De Lucro — Todo Pasa Por Algo

Best Traditional Tropical Album
Gilberto Santa Rosa — Una Navidad con Gilberto
 Orquesta América — Siempre a Punto
 María Dolores Pradera and Los Sabandeños — Te Canto Un Bolero
 Totó La Momposina — La Bodega
 Orestes Vilató — It's About Time

Best Tropical Song
Jorge Luis Piloto and Jorge Villamizar — "Yo No Sé Mañana" (Luis Enrique)
 Daniel Santacruz — "A Donde Va El Amor?"
 Joan M. Ortiz and Tito "El Bambino" — "El Amor" (Tito "El Bambino")
 Juan de Luque Díaz Granados and Juan Vicente Zambrano — "Esa Muchachita" (Mauricio & Palodeagua)
 Alberto Gaitán and Ricardo Gaitán — "No Vale La Pena" (Issac Delgado)

Singer-Songwriter
Best Singer-Songwriter Album
Caetano Veloso — Zii e Zie
 Ricardo Arjona — 5to Piso
 Franco De Vita — Simplemente La Verdad
 Rosana — A Las Buenas y A Las Malas
 Tom Zé — Estudando A Bossa - Nordeste Plaza

Regional Mexican
Best Ranchero Album
Vicente Fernández — Primera Fila
 Shaila Dúrcal — Corazón Ranchero
 José Feliciano — Con México En El Corazón
 Mariachi Reyna de Los Angeles — Compañeras
 Diego Verdaguer — Mexicano Hasta las Pampas

Best Banda Album
Alacranes Musical — Tu Inspiración
 Cuisillos de Arturo Macias — Vientos de Cambio
 Dareyes de la Sierra — Una Copa Mas
 Valentín Elizalde — Solamente El Gallo de Oro
 Germán Montero — Compréndeme

Best Grupero Album
Caballo Dorado — 15x22
 Pipe Bueno — Pipe Bueno
 La Mafia — Eternamente Románticos
 Liberación — Cada Vez Mas Fuerte
 Marco Antonio Solís — No Molestar

Best Tejano Album
Jimmy González & El Grupo Mazz — The Legend Continues...La Continuation
 Avizo — Recordando Josefa
 Grupo Vida — Generations
 Joel Guzman and Sarah Fox — Conjuntazzo
 Jaime & Los Chamacos — Freedom Tour 2008
 Jay Perez — All The Way Live!

Best Norteño Album
Grupo Pesado — Sólo Contigo
 Cardenales de Nuevo León — Se Renta Un Corazón
 Costumbre — Siempre
 Los Huracanes del Norte — Mi Complemento
 Los Invasores de Nuevo León — Amor Aventurero
 Los Rieleros del Norte — Pese a Quien le Pese

Best Regional Song
Marco Antonio Solís — "No Molestar"
 Santa Benith and Ediregi — "Almas Gemelas" (El Trono de México)
 Espinoza Paz — "Espero" (Grupo Montéz de Durango)
 Mario Quintero Lara — "Se Fue Mi Amor" (Los Tucanes de Tijuana)
 Joan Sebastian — "Voy A Conquistarte" (Diego Verdaguer)

Instrumental
Best Instrumental Album
Carlos Franzetti and Eddie Gómez — Duets
 Jovino Santos Neto and Weber Lago — Live At Caramoor
 Mauro Senise — Lua Cheia Mauro Senise Toca Dolores Duran E Sueli Costa
 Omar Sosa — Across The Divide
 Bernie Williams — Moving Forward

Traditional
Best Folk Album
Mercedes Sosa — Cantora 1
 Eva Ayllón — Kimba Fá
 Los Muñequitos de Matanzas — D' Palo Pa' Rumba
 Walter Silva — Ya No Le Camino Mas
 Soledad — Folklore

Best Tango Album
Leopoldo Federico — Mi Fueye Querido
 Cacho Castaña — Yo Seré El Amor
 Melingo — Maldito Tango
 María Estela Monti — Solo Piazzolla
 Narcotango — En Vivo
 Various Artists — TangoNuevo 2.1 De Jaime Wilensky

Best Flamenco Album
Niña Pastori — Esperando Verte
 Vicente Amigo — Paseo de Gracia
 Carmen Linares — Raíces y Alas
 Enrique Morente — Flamenco
 Miguel Poveda — Coplas del Querer

Jazz
Best Latin Jazz Album
Bebo Valdés and Chucho Valdés — Juntos Para Siempre
 Brazilian Trio — Forests
 Bobby Sanabria conducting the Manhattan School Of Music Afro-Cuban Jazz Orchestra — Kenya Revisited Live!!!
 Charlie Sepulveda and The Turnaround — Sepulveda Boulevard
 Nestor Torres — Nouveau Latino

Christian
Best Christian Album (Spanish Language)
Paulina Aguirre — Esperando Tu Voz
 Lucía Parker — Alabanza Y Adoración: Del Corazón
 Promissa — Poquito A Poco
 David Velásquez — Su Trayectoria
 Alan Villatoro — Tuyo Soy

Best Christian Album (Portuguese Language)
Oficina G3 — Depois da Guerra
 Regis Danese — Compromisso
 Marina De Oliveira — Eu Não Vou Parar
 Jozyanne — Eu Tenho A Promessa
 André Valadão — Fé

Brazilian
Best Brazilian Contemporary Pop Album
Roupa Nova — Em Londres
 Jota Quest — La Plata
 Rita Lee — Multishow ao Vivo
 Ivete Sangalo — Pode Entrar
 Skank — Estandarte

Best Brazilian Rock Album
NX Zero — Agora
Titãs — Sacos Plásticos
 Cachorro Grande — Cinema
 Erasmo Carlos — Rock 'n' Roll
 Zé Ramalho — Zé Ramalho Canta Bob Dylan - Tá Tudo Mudando

Best Samba/Pagode Album
Martinho da Vila — O Pequeno Burguês!!
 Arlindo Cruz — MTV ao Vivo
 Exaltasamba — Ao Vivo na Ilha da Magia
 Harmonia do Samba — Romântico ao Vivo
 Inimigos da Hp — Ao Vivo em Zoodstock
 Zeca Pagodinho — Uma Prova de Amor

Best MPB Album
Ivan Lins and the Metropole Orchestra — Regência: Vince Mendoza
 Zeca Baleiro — O Coração do Homem_Bomba Volume 1
 Zélia Duncan — Pelo Sabor do Gesto
 Jorge Vercillo — Trem da Minha Vida – Ao Vivo
 Wanderléa — Nova Estação

Best Sertaneja Music Album
Sérgio Reis — Coração Estradeiro
 João Bosco & Vinícius — Curtição
 Bruno & Marrone — De Volta aos Bares
 Edson & Hudson — Despedida
 César Menotti & Fabiano — Voz do Coração (Ao Vivo)
 Victor & Leo — Borboletas

Best Native Brazilian Roots Album
Daniel — As Músicas do Filme O Menino da Porteira
 Mazinho Quevedo — Alma Caipira
 Os Serranos — 40 Anos - Sempre Gaúchos!
 Tchê Guri — A Festa
 Tradição — Micareta 2 Sertaneja

Best Tropical Brazilian Roots Album
Elba Ramalho — Balaio de Amor
 Banda Calypso — Amor Sem Fim
 Caju & Castanha — Sorria Você Está Sendo Filmado
 Netinho — Minha Praia
 Orquestra Contemporânea de Olinda — Orquestra Contemporânea de Olinda

Best Brazilian Song
Lenine — "Martelo Bigorna"
 Caetano Veloso — "A Cor Amarela"
 Gigi and Ivete Sangalo — "Agora Eu Já Sei" (Ivete Sangalo)
 Nando Reis — "Ainda Não Passou"
 Dadi, Seu Jorge and Marisa Monte — "Não é Proibido" (Marisa Monte)

Children's
Best Latin Children Album
Various Artists — Pombo Musical
Jair Oliveira and Tania Khalill — Grandes Pequeninos
 Rita Rosa — El Patio De Tu Casa
 Ivete Sangalo and Saulo Fernandes (Veveta and Saulinho) — A Casa Amarela
 Vitor and Vitória — Vitor e Vitória

Classical
Best Classical Album
Sonia Rubinsky — Villa-Lobos: Piano Music; Guia Pratico, Albums 10 and 11; Suite Infantil Nos. 1 and 2
 Andrés Díaz — Bach: Cello Suites
 Ricardo Kanji and Rosana Lanzelotte — Cavaleiro Neukomm Criador Da Música De Câmara No Brasil
 Ricardo Morales and the Pacifica Quartet — Concierto De Aniversario

Best Classical Contemporary Composition
Gabriela Lena Frank — "Inca Dances" (Manuel Barrueco and Cuarteto Latinoamericano)
 Orlando Jacinto Garcia — "Cuatro Asimetrias para el Cuarteto de Guitarras de Asturias entre Quatret" (Orlando Jacinto Garcia)
 Clarice Assad — "Danças Nativas" (Aquarelle Guitar Quartet)
 Roberto Sierra — "Variations On a Souvenir" (Roberto Sierra)
 Alfonso Fuentes — "Voces del Barrio" (Kathleen Jones)

Recording Package
Best Recording Package
Alejandro Ros — Cantora 1 (Mercedes Sosa)
 Rubén Scaramuzzino — Andrés: Obras Incompletas (Andrés Calamaro)
 7Potencias.Net — Aocaná (Ojos de Brujo)
 Juan Gatti — Bosegrafía (Miguel Bosé)
 Jesús Sarabia — Dramas y Caballeros (Luis Ramiro)

Production
Best Engineered Album
Dani Espinet, Micky Forteza Rey, Jose Luis Molero, Jordi Solé and Tom Backer — Orquesta Reciclando (Jarabe de Palo)
 Bori Alarcón, Alfonso Espadero and Javier García — Despertar (India Martínez)
 Gabriel Pinheiro and Ricardo Dias — Dois Mundos (Scott Feiner & Pandeiro Jazz, produced by Scott Feiner and David Feldman (musician))
 Denílson Campos, Rodrigo Delacroix, Jr Tostoi and Ricardo Garcia — Labiata (Lenine)
 Renato Alsher, Fernando Aponte, Julio Berta, Marcos Cunha, Zé Guilherme, Caco Law, Alex Moreira, LC Varella and Carlos Freitas — Telecoteco (Paula Morelenbaum)

Producer of the Year
Cachorro López
 Aureo Baqueiro
 Sergio George
 J. Jiménez "Chaboli"
 José Lugo

Music Video
Best Short Form Music Video
Calle 13 featuring Rubén Blades — "La Perla"
 Ricardo Arjona — "Cómo Duele"
 Babasónicos — "Las Demás"
 Bebe — "Me Fui"
 Zoé — "Reptilectric"

Best Long Form Music Video
Roberto Carlos and Caetano Veloso — E A Música De Tom Jobim
 Gian Marco — En Vivo Desde El Lunario
 Draco Rosa — Teatro
 Ivete Sangalo — Pode Entrar: Multishow Registro
 Tempo — Free Tempo

Special Awards
Lifetime Achievement Awards
 Cándido Camero
 Beth Carvalho
 Charly García
 Tania Libertad
 Marco Antonio Muñiz
 Juan Romero

Trustees Awards
 José Antonio Abreu
 Roberto Cantoral García

Performers
 Intro — "Latin Grammy 2009" 00:39
 Laura Pausini — "En Cambio No" 04:00
 Pepe Aguilar — "Me Vas A Extrañar"
 Luis Fonsi — "Nada Es Para Siempre / Aquí Estoy Yo / No Me Doy Por Vencido"
 Reik — "Inolvidable"
 Shaila Dúrcal and Mariachi Reyna De Los Angeles — "Tatuajes" 05:06
 Wisin & Yandel — "Te Siento / Abusadora"
 Calle 13 featuring Rubén Blades — "La Perla" 04:19
 David Bisbal and Luz Ríos — "Aire"
 Los Tucanes De Tijuana — "Se Fue Mi Amor"
 La Quinta Estación — "Me Dueles"
 Alejandro Sanz and Alicia Keys — "Looking For Paradise" 06:00
 Grupo Montéz de Durango featuring Espinoza Paz — "Espero"
 Oscar D'León and Gilberto Santa Rosa — "Yo Quisiera / Yo La Agarro Bajando / Detalle / Que Manera De Quererte"
 Juan Gabriel — "Medley" 34:16
 Daniela Mercury — "Cidade / Rapunzel / Mais Que Nada / País Tropical / Mamãe Eu Quero / Aquarela do Brasil" 03:40

Presenters
 Alejandra Guzmán — presented Best Norteño Album
 Eva Longoria and Alejandro Sanz — presented Record of the Year
 Milly Quezada and Johnny Ventura — presented Best Salsa Album
 Enrique Iglesias — presented People of the Year
 Charytín — introduced Wisin & Yandel
 David Bisbal and Kany García — presented Best New Artist
 Cucu Diamantes and Beto Cuevas — presented Best Regional Song
 Omara Portuondo and Pau Donés — presented Song of the Year
 Alexander Acha and Marlene Favela — presented Best Female Pop Vocal Album
 Víctor Manuelle and Stefanía Fernández — presented Best Urban Song
 Rubén Blades — presented the tribute to Mercedes Sosa
 Rosana, Gian Marco and Luis Enrique — presented Best Pop Album by a Duo/Group with Vocals
 Amaia Montero and Aarón Díaz — presented Best Contemporary Tropical Album
 Dulce María and Germán Montero — presented Best Rock Solo Vocal Album
 Juan Luis Guerra — presented Album of the Year

Trivia
 The show marked the first time since 2000 where the same artist did not win both Record of the Year and Song of the Year.
 Omara Portuondo became the first Cuban artist who lives in Cuba to receive an award on stage. She was awarded Best Contemporary Tropical Album for her album, Gracias.
 Juan Gabriel has the record for the longest performance on the main show, clocking at more than 34 minutes.

References

External links
 Latin Academy of Recording Arts & Sciences
 Univision Site: 

Latin Grammy Awards by year
Latin Grammy Awards
Grammy Awards
Annual Latin Grammy Awards
Annual Latin Grammy Awards